Sgt. Franklin John Rock is a fictional character appearing in American comic books published by DC Comics. Sgt. Rock first appeared in Our Army at War #83 (June 1959), and was created by Robert Kanigher and Joe Kubert. The character is a World War II soldier who served as an infantry non-commissioned officer.

Publication history

Sgt. Rock's prototype first appeared in G.I. Combat #68 (January 1959). His rank is not given in this story; instead, he is merely called "The Rock". The Rock returned as a sergeant in Our Army at War #81 (April 1959) named "Sgt. Rocky" with his unit, Easy Company (the precise US Army infantry regiment to which Easy belonged was never identified during the history of the character). This second prototype story was written by Bob Haney, but the character's creator, Robert Kanigher was the editor. Kanigher would go on to create the bulk of the stories with Joe Kubert as the artist. In issue #82 (May 1959), he is called "Sgt. Rock" (name only) and by issue #83 (June 1959), he makes his first full appearance as Sgt. Rock.

Sgt. Rock steadily gained popularity, until, in 1977, the name of the comic was changed to Sgt. Rock. The comic ran until Sgt. Rock #422 (July 1988). In addition to the semi-regular comic, several "digests" were sold, under the DC Special Blue Ribbon Digest banner, reprinting stories from Our Army at War or Sgt. Rock. Some were subtitled as OAAW or Sgt. Rock, some as Sgt. Rock's Prize Battle Tales (the Prize Battle Tales title was also used on earlier 80-page annual specials). The digest format was 4" × 6", softcover, with 98 full-color pages and no advertisements.

A 21-issue run of reprints followed from 1988 to 1991, and two Sgt. Rock Specials with new content saw publication in 1992 and 1994. A Christmas-themed story appeared in DCU Holiday Bash II in 1997, again featuring new content.

According to John Wells, in Fanzing 36 (July 2001), an online fan magazine:

In at least one Sgt. Rock comic book published in the late 1960s, it was revealed that Sgt. Rock had a brother who was an infantry officer in the U.S. Marine Corps, fighting in the Pacific Theater. In this episode, Sgt. Rock told his fellow soldiers about a weird combat incident that his brother had taken part in on a Pacific island, shown in the comic in a "flashback" style.

A Viet Nam soldier by the name of Adam Rock appears in Swamp Thing #16 (May 1975), though it is never specifically stated if he is intended to be a relative of Frank Rock.

DC Comics published Sgt. Rock: The Lost Battalion, written and drawn by William Tucci, starting in November 2008. The story places Rock and Easy Company with the 1st Battalion, 141st Infantry, which was surrounded by German forces in the Vosges Mountains on October 24, 1944, and eventually rescued by the Japanese-American 442nd Regimental Combat Team.

The Lost Battalion also revives other World War II-era DC characters, such as the Haunted Tank, and "Navajo Ace" Johnny Cloud, and the story itself is mainly narrated by combat journalist William J. Kilroy, and German General Friedrich Wiese.

Fictional character biography

During World War II, Sgt. Rock fought in the infantry branch of the U.S. Army in the European Theatre and eventually rose to authority within his unit, Easy Company. The unit was a collection of disparate individuals who managed to participate in every major action in the European war. Rock's dog-tag number was 409966, which had been, it was claimed, Robert Kanigher's own military serial number.

Robert Kanigher mused in letters columns in the 1970s and 1980s that Rock probably belonged to "The Big Red One" (First US Infantry Division) given his appearance on battlefields in North Africa, Italy, and Northwest Europe. Rock's backstory was fleshed out in different comics over the years; generally he is considered to have come from Pittsburgh, Pennsylvania, where he worked in a steel mill. Enlisting after the attack on Pearl Harbor, he went to North Africa as a private but promotion came quickly as his superiors were killed, to assistant squad leader, squad leader, and then platoon sergeant. During the main series, his unit is only ever given as "Easy Company", but no regiment or division is named nor is unit insignia ever shown. Rock is shown to have two siblings (Sgt. Rock #421): Larry, a Marine fighting in the Pacific and Amy, a nun.
In the 2009 six-issue mini-series Sgt. Rock: The Lost Battalion Rock's unit is still referred to as "Easy Company" but is of the 141st Infantry Regiment. However, in the closing pages of the last issue, the narration states that, following the end of the story, "as usual, Sgt. Rock's 'Combat-Happy Joes' moved out to fill the ranks of another Easy Company left fractured by war", moving them to the 15th Infantry Regiment, 3rd Division, under 2nd Lieutenant Audie Murphy. A famous tagline of Rock's is: "Nothin's easy in Easy Company".

Rock also usually wears the chevrons and rockers of a Master Sergeant on his uniform and also applied, oversize, to the front of his helmet.

It is likely Rock's official position in Easy Company was of senior platoon sergeant though dialogue and scripts are usually vague on his actual responsibilities and duties. He usually leads patrols and appears to have powers of command over the men of the company. Several officer characters also appeared in the comic, as both platoon and company commanders, all of whom were regarded by Rock as superiors. Ever the model NCO, Sgt. Rock always rendered proper respect to these officers, and was always quick to give advice to not only ensure success, but for that officer to gain confidence and experience as a leader. Easy's commander was usually referred to as "the skipper" by Rock. Rock in turn was referred to by others as the "topkick", or senior non-commissioned officer in the company. Most infantry companies did not have master sergeants; significantly, Rock does not have the diamond of a first sergeant on his rank insignia.

Powers and abilities
 Rock is a crack shot, able to shoot down several German fighter planes with a single submachine gun, and able to throw hand grenades with amazing accuracy.
 Rock is a highly effective close combat fighter, mostly shown using a style of street fighting mixed with boxing and judo.
 Rock seems to have close to superhuman endurance and strength, surviving large number of gunshot wounds, fragments from hand grenades, exposure to freezing water and other hazards. Rock's powers seem to be more realistic in Bob Kanigher's stories than in Joe Kubert's.
 Rock's "Combat Antenna" is what he calls a kind of sixth sense to warn him of impending enemy attack. This usually allows him at least some time to warn Easy Co. even if it rarely allows them to get out of harm's way entirely.
 With very few exceptions, Rock maintains complete calm and determination under fire, even when the odds are stacked high against his and/or Easy Co.'s success.
 Rock also has a heart. The one thing that (almost) had him breaking down is when the Nazis scraped the very bottom of the barrel and were sending teenage boys out against Rock and his men, or when he and his company were guarding a group of children who had to be evacuated from an orphanage, and one died from a German bullet.

Equipment 
The classic Rock was usually dressed in olive drab fatigues, with a .45-caliber M1A1 Thompson submachine gun (although sometimes he is shown using an M50 Reising instead) and .45-caliber Colt M1911A1 semi-automatic pistol as his armament. Oddly, the classic artwork almost always depicts Rock with an M1 Garand cartridge belt which would be useless to him, as well as two belts of .50-caliber ammunition (drawn as .30 caliber fabric belted for M1917 Browning machine gun), which Rock considers lucky charms. Artists John Severin and Russ Heath sometimes attempted a more realistic portrayal of Rock's equipment, but the .50-caliber ammunition remained a personal trademark. Rock is always shown with a number of hand grenades secured to his equipment.

Fates of Sgt. Rock
The ultimate fate of Sgt. Frank Rock is complicated. There were initially two versions of the character, one residing on Earth-One and the other residing on Earth-Two. According to a number of stories, he was killed on the last day of the war by the last enemy bullet fired. However, DC has also published a number of stories incorporating a post-war Rock into the modern stories of superheroes, including appearances alongside Batman, Superman and the Suicide Squad.

In stories told after the demise of his own comic book, Rock's character was revived, explained to have survived the war, and went on to perform covert missions for the United States government. He also battled his old foe, the Iron Major, and went on an adventure to Dinosaur Island with his old second in command, Bulldozer. According to John Wells:Kanigher had established Frank's post-war survival in OAAW #168, wherein he had Rock visit the Tomb of the Unknown Soldier, and Bob Haney picked up on that fact in The Brave and the Bold. In issue #84, he'd had Rock and Easy cross paths with Bruce (Batman) Wayne during the war (in an episode obviously set on Earth-Two) and followed up with a present-day sequel in Brave & the Bold #96. In that one, Bruce arrived at the United States Embassy in South America and was introduced to "our Military Attache and Chief of Embassy Security ... Sergeant Rock, U.S. Army". Two subsequent present-day episodes found Rock tracking a Satanic figure that he believed was Adolf Hitler (B&B #108) and an Easy Company "ghost" that he'd been ordered to execute at the Battle of the Bulge (B&B #117). In the bizarre Brave & the Bold #124, Bob Haney and Jim Aparo actually guest-starred as Rock and Batman trailed a terrorist organization called the 1000. Following this, he appeared as a general and a Chief of Staff for Lex Luthor's administration. However, Frank Rock was involved with an incarnation of the Suicide Squad. At the end of the title, he peels off a mask and walks away from the team, while his companion "Bulldozer", assumed to be the original, stands up from his wheelchair, comments on how it was good to feel young again, and also walks away. Whether this was the real Frank Rock in disguise or an impostor is unknown; the series concludes with the line "Frank Rock died in 1945".
The use of the Rock character in post-war stories had one major effect on Rock's backstory, according to Wells:All of the super-hero crossovers were more than Kanigher could take. In the letter columns of 1978's Sgt. Rock #316 and 323 and 1980's Sgt. Rock #347 and 348, he announced that his hero had not lived past 1945, blunting most of Haney's Brave and the Bold episodes if nothing else. He also proclaimed: "It is inevitable and wholly in character that neither Rock nor Easy survived the closing days of the war". Indeed, in the letter column for Sgt. Rock #374, Kanigher stated that:As far as I'm concerned ROCK is the only authentic World War II Soldier. For obvious reasons. He and Easy Company live only, and will eventually die, to the last man, in World War II.

The first use of the Rock character after the demise of the series was an issue of Swamp Thing, six months after the release of Sgt. Rock #422. The story was set in May 1945, intimating that Sgt. Rock had survived the war in Europe and raised the question of whether Rock transferred to the Pacific theatre.

During the Imperiex War set in the early 2000s, Rock acted as head of the Joint Chiefs, volunteering for the suicide mission to pilot a plane loaded with nuclear bombs as part of a plan to crack Imperiex Prime's armor and drain his energy. In a conversation with Strange Visitor, he states that he would prefer to be dead rather than live for so long after the war and seeing so many other good men die while he survived. Following the victory against Imperiex, Amanda Waller oversees his symbolic funeral in Arlington with other World War II heroes, informing Luthor over the phone that Rock had no interest in being remembered and would simply want to rest in peace with his peers.

In keeping with Robert Kanigher's often-mentioned (in letter columns and interviews) but never-scripted conclusion to Rock's wartime adventures (Kanigher did not get the chance to write this tale himself before he died in 2002), Len Wein and Joe Kubert's 2010 back-up story "Snapshot: Remembrance" from the retrospective mini-series DC Universe: Legacies #4 (depicting a July 4, 1976 DC war heroes' reunion) reveals that Sgt. Rock did die at the close of WWII. Flashbacks illustrate Rock being killed on the last day of the war in Europe, while using his body to shield a small child who had wandered into crossfire. Easy Company learns later that the final bullet that killed him was the last bullet fired in the war. The other DC war heroes attending this bicentennial reunion (and toasting the memory of Sgt. Rock) are Jeb Stuart of the Haunted Tank, all four Losers, Ulysses Hazard AKA Gravedigger, Mademoiselle Marie (who introduces her unnamed son, a soldier almost identical in appearance to Sgt. Rock—who is strongly implied to be his father) and the Unknown Soldier, disguised (with one of his signature latex masks) as Bob the bartender.

Other versions

Flashpoint
In the Flashpoint universe, Sgt. Rock was a member of Team 7, an elite unit of soldiers led by Grifter. Sgt. Rock and most of his teammates were ultimately killed during a botched attack on a terrorist training camp.

British comics character
Another character also called Sgt. Rock appeared in the British weekly comic Smash! from issue #156 (1969) published originally by Odhams and later IPC Magazines. This Sgt. Rock, who has no connection to the DC Comics character, was a British Paratrooper who was later shown serving with the S.A.S.

In other media

Television
 Sgt. Rock appears in the Justice League three-part episode "The Savage Time", voiced by Fred Dryer. 
 Sgt. Rock appears in the teaser for the Batman: The Brave and the Bold episode "The Plague of the Prototypes!", voiced by Fred Tatasciore.
 A soldier implied to be Sgt. Rock appears in the Legends of Tomorrow episode "Legendary", portrayed by Blair Penner. Series co-executive producer Marc Guggenheim stated that they have a plan to bring in Sgt. Rock eventually, though this never came to pass.

Film
 In the late 1980s and early 1990s, Arnold Schwarzenegger was attached to play Sgt. Rock in a film produced by Joel Silver, with screenplays written by David Webb Peoples (1987), Steven E. de Souza (1988), John Milius (1993), and Brian Helgeland (1996) depicting Rock as a German-American father before John Cox wrote a new screenplay unrelated to the previous drafts. Eventually, Cox stated that Schwarzenegger was no longer attached to star in the project. In April 2007, David Gambino, VP of Silver Pictures said, "The good news is we have a fantastic screenplay and everybody's really happy with it. It's really just about trying to attach cast right now and really decide what the movie is going to be, how we're going to make it". Bruce Willis was reportedly in consideration for the role and Guy Ritchie rumored to direct. However, in December 2008, Ritchie said that while the film was shelved due to his work on Sherlock Holmes, he confirmed that the Sgt. Rock film will indeed be set during World War II and include the Easy Company. In February 2010, Silver announced the setting change from World War II to another battle in the near future, but no further progress was announced.
 Sgt. Rock appears in DC Showcase: Sgt. Rock, voiced by Karl Urban.

Video games
 Activision confirmed at E3 1997 that they were developing a Sgt. Rock game for the PlayStation, set for release in 1998, but the game was never mentioned again.
 Sgt. Rock appears in Sgt. Rock: On the Frontline.
 Sgt. Rock appears in DC Universe Online.

Miscellaneous
Sgt. Rock received a figure in the HeroClix line as part of the "Cosmic Justice" expansion. Additionally, a limited edition tournament prize figure of "General Frank Rock" was released as well.

Merchandise and collectibles

 A line of 3¾" action figures bearing the Sgt. Rock name was released in the 1980s by Remco Toys, likely as a result of the popularity of Hasbro's G.I. Joe toy line. The figures had little resemblance to the World War II characters of the comic books. The Sgt. Rock figure was depicted in Vietnam-era fatigues and gear and had an M16 rifle instead of a Thompson submachine gun. Other generic figures were sold, with no other characters recognizable from the comics. These US troops also had Vietnam-era equipment and helmets/helmet covers or berets, and were collectively referred to as "Tough Action Soldiers". "Enemy" soldiers were simply toys produced from the same molds used to make the US soldiers, painted black with blue helmets. Each figure came with a plastic dog tag on which purchasers could ink their name and rank. A serial number was printed on a paper sticker affixed to the plastic tag, which also came with a silver-colored string to suspend the tag around the neck. Playsets included plastic machine gun and mortar bunkers. The quality of these toys was very low; soft plastic was used, and joints had limited movement, especially compared to the G.I. Joe line of 3¾" action figures.
 There was also a range of diecast metal vehicles, produced by Universal Toys for Azrak-Hamway of New York. These were packaged on cards similar to the Remco Action Figures. The range included two tanks, a Jeep, a staff car and an ambulance.

 In 2002, a limited edition of 12" Sgt. Rock figures was released by Hasbro, as part of the 12" G.I. Joe line, including four other characters from the comic book series; Bulldozer, Little Sure Shot, Jackie Johnson and Wildman. The figures wore World War II-era fatigues and mostly carried the same weapons as in the comic books (though the Bulldozer figure carries an M-1 rifle instead of an air-cooled Browning .30-calibre machine gun). A female figure was also released, portraying French Resistance fighter Mademoiselle Marie, Sgt. Rock's only love interest during the comic book series. A number of playsets were also produced by Dreams and Visions in 2003.

Cultural references
 In the graphic novel Tank Girl, Tank Girl's helmet has "Sgt. Rock Can't Dock" written on it.
 The English rock band XTC included a song called "Sgt. Rock (Is Going to Help Me)" on their 1980 album Black Sea. The song was released as a single that December and reached No. 16 on the UK Singles Chart. Songwriter Andy Partridge would later pen songs about two other DC Comics characters, Supergirl (on their 1986 album Skylarking) and Brainiac's Daughter (on the 1987 Dukes of Stratosphear album Psonic Psunspots).
 The character Xander Harris made frequent references to Rock on the TV series Buffy The Vampire Slayer.
 During the end credits of the 1987 film Predator, Lt. Hawkins (Shane Black) is shown reading Sgt. Rock #408 (February 1986).
 One issue of the underground comic Dopin' Dan had a Sgt. Rock parody called Sgt. Jock. It featured the main character leading a dispirited platoon in the Vietnam War and taking out two deliberately anachronistic foes by impossible means, namely destroying a Tiger Tank with nothing but a brass knuckles assisted punch, then downing a Stuka dive bomber by throwing a bayonet through the windshield, killing the pilot.
 On the TV series Trucks!, host Stacey David built an off-road truck out of a 1941 Dodge WC-14 and named it Sgt. Rock.
 A 1996 episode of The Simpsons, "Raging Abe Simpson and His Grumbling Grandson in 'The Curse of the Flying Hellfish', is considered a homage to both Sgt. Rock and Joe Kubert's art design.
 American singer-songwriter Elliott Smith mentions him in the song "Color Bars", on the album Figure 8: "Sgt. Rock broke the key off in the lock to where I come from".
 The back cover art of the Beach Boys' 1974 album Endless Summer depicts Carl Wilson reading a Sgt. Rock comic.
 In the film The Package, the character played by Tommy Lee Jones is compared to Sgt. Rock.

Reception
Sgt. Rock was ranked as the 183rd-greatest comic book character of all time by Wizard magazine. IGN also listed Sgt. Rock as the 78th-greatest comic book hero of all time stating that Sgt. Rock represents the epitome of DC's often overlooked World War II comics.

Collected editions
The series has been collected into a number of trade paperbacks:

See also
 Sergeant York
 Nick Fury

References

External links
Sgt. Rock at Don Markstein's Toonopedia.
Frank Rock Chronology at the DCU Guide
Fred Hembeck: Sgt. Rock and Easy Company
Sgt. Rock at Mike's Amazing World of Comics

Characters created by Joe Kubert
Characters created by Robert Kanigher
Comics by Robert Kanigher
Comics characters introduced in 1959
Comics magazines published in the United States
DC Comics set during World War II
DC Comics military personnel
DC Comics superheroes
Defunct American comics
Fictional characters from Pittsburgh
Fictional generals
Fictional military sergeants
Fictional United States Army non-commissioned officers
Fictional World War II veterans
Vertigo Comics titles